Jelušić is a South Slavic surname.

Notable people with the name include:
 Ana Jelušić (born 1986), Croatian skier
 Ernest Jelušić (1863–1910), Croatian priest and politician
 Tatjana Aparac-Jelušić (born 1948), Croatian librarian
 Veselin Jelušić, Serbian football manager

See also
 Jelusić

Croatian surnames